Lal Lal is a town in Victoria (Australia), Australia.

Lal Lal Falls and the Lal Lal Reservoir on the Moorabool River are to the north-east and east of the town.

History
The original settlement at Lal Lal was part of a substantial sheep run dating from 1845. The township became more firmly established after the mining of iron ore, lignite, kaolin (clay) and gold began in the area.

The railway arrived at Lal Lal in April 1862 and Lal Lal Post Office opened on 18 July 1863
(closing in 1969).

Heritage listed sites
Lal Lal contains a number of heritage listed sites, including:

 Iron Mine Road, Lal Lal Iron Mine and Smelting Works
 389 Yendon-Lal Lal Road, Rothbury

See also 
 List of reduplicated Australian place names

References

External links 

 Lal Lal at Shire of Moorabool website

Towns in Victoria (Australia)